Barash is a surname. Notable people with the surname include:

Brandon Barash
David P. Barash
Joshua Barash
Amanuel Barash

See also 
Blush (2015 film), originally titled "Barash"
Barash(Wally), the hero of the animated series Kikoriki
Sy Barash Regatta
Barasch